The Danger Rider is a lost 1928 American silent Western film directed by Henry MacRae and starring Hoot Gibson. It was produced and distributed by Universal Pictures.

Cast
 Hoot Gibson - Hal Doyle
 Eugenia Gilbert - Mollie Dare
 B. Reeves Eason - Tucson Joe
 Monte Montague - Scar Bailey
 King Zany - Blinky Ben
 Frank Beal - Warden Doyle
 Milla Davenport - Housekeeper
 Bud Osborne - Sheriff

References

External links
 
 

1928 films
Lost American films
Films directed by Henry MacRae
Universal Pictures films
Lost Western (genre) films
1928 Western (genre) films
1928 lost films
Silent American Western (genre) films
1920s American films
1920s English-language films